The Bredon cohomology, introduced by Glen E. Bredon, is a type of equivariant cohomology that is a contravariant functor from the category of G-complex with equivariant homotopy maps to the category of abelian groups together with the connecting homomorphism satisfying some conditions.

References 

Cohomology theories